The Réserve Africaine de Sigean is a  zoo that opened in 1974 in Sigean, Aude, in the south of France.

The zoo is home to some 3,800 animals representing about 160 species, and is a member of the European Association of Zoos and Aquaria (EAZA) and the World Association of Zoos and Aquariums (WAZA).

External links

 (in French)

Zoos in France
Buildings and structures in Aude
Tourist attractions in Aude
Zoos established in 1974
Organizations based in Occitania (administrative region)